Khaleeq Ur Rehman Khaleelur Rahman (4 January 1936 – 11 January 2011
) was an Indian Member of the Rajya Sabha. He was one of the great thinker for the welfare of 
minorities in Hyderabad, and began his political career as a Telugu Desam Party party worker. He died at the age of 75. He is the key person to have provided services to pilgrims in Mecca at Nizam Rubad for Hyderabadis.

References

Rajya Sabha members from Andhra Pradesh
Politicians from Hyderabad, India
Telugu Desam Party politicians
Indian National Congress politicians from Andhra Pradesh
Telugu politicians
1941 births
Year of death missing